Toxoniella is a genus of spiders in the family Liocranidae. It was first described in 2002 by Warui & Jocqué. , it contains five species, all from Kenya.

References

Endemic fauna of Kenya
Liocranidae
Araneomorphae genera
Spiders of Africa